Ante Meridian is a misspelling of:

 Antimeridian, a meridian at 180° from another or the meridian opposite the prime meridian
 Ante meridiem, normally abbreviated a.m., Latin for "before midday"